Johan Frederik Marie "Hans" Houtzager (26 August 1910 – 29 December 1993) was a Dutch hammer thrower. He competed at the 1936 and 1948 Summer Olympics and finished in 12th place in 1948. Two years earlier he was fifth at the 1946 European Athletics Championships.

Houtzager retired from competitions in 1952, shortly after winning his last national title. His son Hans Houtzager Jr. also competed in the hammer throw and became the national champion in 1969.

References

1910 births
1993 deaths
Athletes (track and field) at the 1936 Summer Olympics
Athletes (track and field) at the 1948 Summer Olympics
Dutch male hammer throwers
Olympic athletes of the Netherlands
People from Naaldwijk
Sportspeople from South Holland
20th-century Dutch people